A list of films produced by the Marathi language film industry based in Maharashtra in 2014.

January – March

April – June

July – September

October – December

References

External links
http://www.gomolo.com/2010-2019/marathi-movies-2014

Lists of 2014 films by country or language
2014 in Indian cinema
2014